Modulations: Cinema for the Ear is 1998 documentary film on the history of electronic music, consisting of a documentary film, accompanied by a soundtrack album, and a 2000 book Modulations A History of Electronic Music by Peter Shapiro. The project was directed by Iara Lee, the maker of the documentary film Synthetic Pleasures.

Modulations, Cinema for the Ear (1998)

Soundtrack

 "I Feel Love" – Donna Summer
 "Planet Rock" – Afrika Bambaataa & Soulsonic Force
 "No UFO's" (remix) – Model 500
 "Simon from Sydney" – LFO
 "Strings of Life" – Rhythm Is Rhythm
 "Yeah" – Jesse Saunders
 "Amazon 2-King of the Beats" – Aphrodite
 "Stormbringer" – Panacea
 "The Shadow" – Rob & Goldie
 "Luxus 1-3" – Ryoji Ikeda
 "Atomic 2000" – Coldcut
 "Kritische Masse 1" – To Rococo Rot

References

External links
 
 Modulations homepage at Caipirinha Productions
 

1998 films
Multimedia works
Documentary films about electronic music and musicians
1998 soundtrack albums
Documentary film soundtracks